is a railway station on Kintetsu Railway's Kyoto Line in the city of Uji, Kyoto Prefecture, Japan.

Lines
 Kintetsu Railway
 Kyoto Line

Layout
The station has two platforms serving four tracks.

History
1928 - The station opens as a station of Nara Electric Railroad
1963 - NER merges and the station becomes part of Kintetsu
1987 - The station becomes elevated
2007 - Starts using PiTaPa

Adjacent stations

References

Railway stations in Japan opened in 1928
Railway stations in Kyoto Prefecture